Sera-Lys McArthur is a Canadian actress whose roles include Hailey Martin in CBC's Arctic Air, Amanda in Hard Rock Medical, and Kodie Chartrand in season 3 of The CW's legal drama television series Burden of Truth. McArthur is proud of her indigenous Assiniboine heritage and hopes to act as role model for aspiring actors of all diverse ethnicities. As for video games, in the twenty-first expansion to be added into Tom Clancy's Rainbow Six Siege, she plays the role of Mina "Thunderbird" Sky—a Canadian operator of Nakota ancestry.

Early life
McArthur was born and brought up in Regina, Saskatchewan, Her father was Nakota/Assiniboine Pheasant Rump Nakota First Nation and her mother was a German-Canadian actress.

McArthur started her training at high school age, singing, acting, dancing attending musical theatre and TV and film workshops. At the age of 18, McArthur moved to the United States to study post-secondary music theatre training at the American Musical and Dramatic Academy in New York City. Following this she moved to British Columbia to study method, Studio and Meisner technique acting classes, also general arts at Capilano University in Vancouver. She furthered her acting education in England at from East 15 Acting School at the University of Essex in Loughton, Essex, to become a classically trained actor, graduating with a Master of Arts degree in acting with distinction. McArthur moved back to New York City and Toronto and likened the travelling of her acting career to "following the buffalo," as was the nomadic way of her Nakota/Assiniboine ancestors.

Career 
McArthur's debut screen appearance was at age 13  while working for a children's modelling agency  in the 1999 CBC TV movie/miniseries Revenge of the Land as the daughter of fellow native American and Outlander actress Carmen Moore.
McArthur played the role of Azrael in The Lost Angel in 2004.
Between 2012 and 2014, McArthur played Hailey Martin for 8 episodes of CBC's Arctic Air. The same year, while filming Skye & Chang in 2014, McArthur performed many stunts herself, having previously completed three months of taekwondo and martial-arts training. McArthur was purported to be proud that her work on Arctic Air and Skye & Chang both heralded diversity, and highlighted McArthur herself as a television role model for Native American youth, as fellow indigenous actress Tantoo Cardinal is to her. McArthur was a lead actor in the TV-movie Skye & Chang which won the award for best short live feature at the American Indian Film Festival in San Francisco. McArthur was nominated for best lead actress for films with strong aboriginal characters, for both Skye & Chang and The Wolf of Waubamik Woods at the American Indian Film Festival.

Between 2015 and 2018, McArthur played Amanda for 13 episodes of Hard Rock Medical, also in 2018 she plays female lead in Amazon Prime's indie heist film Robbery, followed with a single appearance in 2019 in the Starz television series Outlander as the Mohawk healer Johiehon. In 2020, McArthur stars as Kodie Chartrand, who is of Ojibwe heritage, for 7 episodes of season 3 of The CW's legal drama television series Burden of Truth.

McArthur had main acting roles in two short films chosen to be shown at the 2020 Indianer Inuit: North American Film Festival in Stuttgart, Germany. McArthur played Sasha in Magic Madeleines and Amanda in Blood Lineage both were due to be shown in February 2020.
McArthur starred in the film in Monkey Beach which was a selection for the Winnipeg Aboriginal Film Festival (WAFF) in December 2020.

She won the award for Best Actress at the 2022 American Indian Film Festival, for her performance in the film Broken Angel.

Filmography

Film

Television

Awards and nominations

References

External links 

Sera-Lys McArthur - cv & demo reel
Sera-Lys McArthur - Instagram
Sera-Lys McArthur - twitter
Sera-Lys McArthur website

1986 births
21st-century Canadian actresses
21st-century First Nations people
Living people
Actresses from Saskatchewan
Alumni of East 15 Acting School
Assiniboine people
Canadian film actresses
Canadian television actresses
First Nations actresses
Nakoda (Stoney) people
Canadian people of German descent